A109 may refer to:

 Agusta A109, the former designation of the AgustaWestland AW109, a helicopter model
 A109 road (England)
 A109 road (Kenya)
 RFA Abbeydale (A109) (1937–1959), a tanker of Britain's Royal Navy
 RFA Bayleaf (A109) (1982–2011), a tanker of Britain's Royal Navy